The women's 200 metres was the second-shortest of the four women's track races in the Athletics at the 1964 Summer Olympics program in Tokyo.  It was held on 18 October and 19 October 1964.  42 athletes from 27 nations entered, with 6 not starting in the first round.  The first round and the semifinal were held on 18 October, with the final on 19 October.

Results

First round

The top two runners in each of the 6 heats advanced, as well as the next four fastest runners from across the heats.

First round, heat 1

First round, heat 2

First round, heat 3

First round, heat 4

First round, heat 5

First round, heat 6

Semifinals

The top four runners in each of the two semifinals advanced to the final.

Semifinal 1

Semifinal 2

Final

References

Athletics at the 1964 Summer Olympics
200 metres at the Olympics
1964 in women's athletics
Women's events at the 1964 Summer Olympics